The Houston Astros 2012 season was the 51st and final season for the franchise in the National League in Houston, their 48th as the Astros and their 13th season at Minute Maid Park.

This season was also the Astros' last in the National League. As a part of the sale of the team from Drayton McLane to Jim Crane, the Astros agreed to move from the NL Central to the AL West starting in 2013.

Regular season

NL Central standings

NL Wild Card

Record vs. opponents

Roster

Game log 

|-  style="text-align:center; bgcolor="#ffbbbb"
| 1 || April 6 || Rockies || 3–5 || Guthrie (1–0) || Rodriguez (0–1) ||  Betancourt (1) || 43,464 || Minute Maid Park || 0–1 || L1
|-  style="text-align:center; bgcolor="#bbffbb"
| 2 || April 7 || Rockies || 7–3 || Harrell (1–0) || Moyer (0–1) || || 23,962 || Minute Maid Park || 1–1 || W1
|-  style="text-align:center; bgcolor="#bbffbb"
| 3 || April 8 || Rockies || 3–2 || López (1–0) || Brothers (0–1) || Myers (1) || 14,195 || Minute Maid Park || 2–1 || W2
|-  style="text-align:center; bgcolor="#bbffbb"
| 4 || April 9 || Braves || 8–3 || Happ (1–0) || Beachy (0–1) || || 17,095 || Minute Maid Park || 3–1 || W3
|-  style="text-align:center; bgcolor="#ffbbbb"
| 5 || April 10 || Braves || 4–6 || Hanson (1–1) || Weiland (0–1) || Kimbrel (1) || 22,036 || Minute Maid Park || 3–2 || L1
|-  style="text-align:center; bgcolor="#ffbbbb"
| 6 || April 11 || Braves || 3–6 || Delgado (1–0) || Rodríguez (0–1) || Kimbrel (2) || 18,225 || Minute Maid Park || 3–3 || L2
|-  style="text-align:center; bgcolor="#ffbbbb"
| 7 || April 13 || @ Marlins || 4–5 (11) || Webb (1–0) || Lyon (0–1) || || 30,169 || Marlins Park || 3–4 || L3
|-  style="text-align:center; bgcolor="#bbffbb"
| 8 || April 14 || @ Marlins || 5–4 || Cruz (1–0) || Bell (0–2) || Myers (2) || 31,659 || Marlins Park || 4–4 || W1
|-  style="text-align:center; bgcolor="#ffbbbb"
| 9 || April 15 || @ Marlins || 4–5 (11) || Gaudin (1–0) || Carpenter (0–1) || || 34,232 || Marlins Park || 4–5 || L1
|-  style="text-align:center; bgcolor="#ffbbbb"
| 10 || April 16 || @ Nationals || 3–6 || Strasburg (2–0) || Weiland (0–2) || Rodríguez (2) || 16,245 || Nationals Park || 4–6 || L2
|-  style="text-align:center; bgcolor="#ffbbbb"
| 11 || April 17 || @ Nationals || 0–1 || Gonzalez (1–0) || Rodríguez (0–2) || Lidge (2) || 17,886 || Nationals Park || 4–7 || L3
|-  style="text-align:center; bgcolor="#ffbbbb"
| 12 || April 18 || @ Nationals || 2–3 || Mattheus (2–0) || F. Rodriguez (0–2) || Rodríguez (3) || 14,520 || Nationals Park || 4–8 || L4
|-  style="text-align:center; bgcolor="#bbffbb"
| 13 || April 19 || @ Nationals || 11–4 || Norris (1–0) || Jackson (1–1) || || 18,045 || Nationals Park || 5–8 || W1
|-  style="text-align:center; bgcolor="#ffbbbb"
| 14 || April 20 || Dodgers || 1–3 || Lilly (2–0) || Happ (1–1) || Guerra (7) || 30,270 || Minute Maid Park || 5–9 || L1
|-  style="text-align:center; bgcolor="#ffbbbb"
| 15 || April 21 || Dodgers || 1–5 || Kershaw (1–0) || Weiland (0–3) || || 25,562 || Minute Maid Park || 5–10 || L2
|-  style="text-align:center; bgcolor="#bbffbb"
| 16 || April 22 || Dodgers || 12–0 || Rodríguez (1–2) || Billingsley (2–1) || || 23,948 || Minute Maid Park || 6–10 || W1
|-  style="text-align:center; bgcolor="#ffbbbb"
| 17 || April 23 || @ Brewers || 5–6 || Greinke (2–1) || Harrell (1–1) || Axford (3) || 36,291 || Miller Park || 6–11 || L1 
|-  style="text-align:center; bgcolor="#ffbbbb"
| 18 || April 24 || @ Brewers || 6–9 || Wolf (1–2) || Norris (1–1) || Axford (4) || 38,686 || Miller Park || 6–12 || L2
|-  style="text-align:center; bgcolor="#bbffbb"
| 19 || April 25 || @ Brewers || 7–5 || López (2–0) || Veras (2–1) || Myers (3) || 26,778 || Miller Park || 7–12 || W1
|-  style="text-align:center; bgcolor="#bbffbb"
| 20 || April 27 || @ Reds || 6–4 || Rodríguez (2–2) || Leake (0–3) || Myers (4) || 29,486 || Great American Ball Park || 8–12 || W2
|-  style="text-align:center; bgcolor="#ffbbbb"
| 21 || April 28 || @ Reds || 0–6 || Cueto (3–0) || Harrell (1–2) || || 32,971 || Great American Ball Park || 8–13 || L1
|-  style="text-align:center; bgcolor="#ffbbbb"
| 22 || April 29 || @ Reds || 5–6 || Ondrusek (1–0) || F. Rodriguez (0–3) || Marshall (5) || 31,086 || Great American Ball Park || 8–14 || L2
|-  style="text-align:center; bgcolor="#bbffbb"
| 23 || April 30 || Mets || 4–3 || F. Rodriguez (1–3) || Acosta (0–2) || Myers (5) || 17,536 || Minute Maid Park || 9–14 || W1
|-

|-  style="text-align:center; bgcolor="#bbffbb"
| 24 || May 1 || Mets || 6–3 || Happ (2–1) || Niese (2–1) || Myers (6) || 17,958 || Minute Maid Park || 10–14 || W2
|-  style="text-align:center; bgcolor="#bbffbb"
| 25 || May 2 || Mets || 8–1 || Rodríguez (3–2) || Schwinden (0–1) || || 19,442 || Minute Maid Park || 11–14 || W3
|-  style="text-align:center; bgcolor="#bbffbb"
| 26 || May 4 || Cardinals || 5–4 || Harrell (2–2) || Lohse (4–1) || Myers (7) || 27,201 || Minute Maid Park || 12–14 || W4
|-  style="text-align:center; bgcolor="#bbffbb"
| 27 || May 5 || Cardinals || 8–2 || Norris (2–1) || García (2–2) || || 23,633 || Minute Maid Park || 13–14 || W5
|-  style="text-align:center; bgcolor="#ffbbbb"
| 28 || May 6 || Cardinals || 1–8 || Wainwright (2–3) || Happ (2–2) || || 22,288 || Minute Maid Park || 13–15 || L1
|-  style="text-align:center; bgcolor="#ffbbbb"
| 29 || May 7 || Marlins || 0–4 || Zambrano (1–2) || Rodríguez (3–3) || || 16,531 || Minute Maid Park || 13–16 || L2
|-  style="text-align:center; bgcolor="#bbffbb"
| 30 || May 8 || Marlins || 3–2 || López (3–0) || Webb (1–1) || Myers (8) || 14,801 || Minute Maid Park || 14–16 || W1
|-  style="text-align:center; bgcolor="#ffbbbb"
| 31 || May 9 || Marlins || 3–5 (12) || Webb (2–1) || Carpenter (0–2) || || 16,072 || Minute Maid Park || 14–17 || L1
|-  style="text-align:center; bgcolor="#bbffbb"
| 32 || May 11 || @ Pirates || 1–0 || Norris (3–1) || McDonald (2–2) || Myers (9) || 19,878 || PNC Park || 15–17 || W1
|-  style="text-align:center; bgcolor="#ffbbbb"
| 33 || May 12 || @ Pirates || 2–5 || Morton (2–3) || Happ (2–3) || Cruz (3) || 34,187 || PNC Park || 15–18 || L1
|-  style="text-align:center; bgcolor="#ffbbbb"
| 34 || May 13 || @ Pirates || 2–3 (12) || Watson (3–0) || F. Rodriguez (1–4) || || 27,517 || PNC Park || 15–19 || L2
|-  style="text-align:center; bgcolor="#ffbbbb"
| 35 || May 14 || @ Phillies || 1–5 || Blanton (4–3) || Harrell (2–3) || || 43,824 || Citizens Bank Park || 15–20 || L3
|-  style="text-align:center; bgcolor="#ffbbbb"
| 36 || May 15 || @ Phillies || 3–4 (10) || Diekman (1–0) || Myers (0–1) || || 43,781 || Citizens Bank Park || 15–21 || L4
|-  style="text-align:center; bgcolor="#bbffbb"
| 37 || May 16 || Brewers || 8–3 || Norris (4–1) || Wolf (2–4) || || 15,453 || Minute Maid Park || 16–21 || W1
|-  style="text-align:center; bgcolor="#bbffbb"
| 38 || May 17 || Brewers || 4–0 || Happ (3–3) || Marcum (2–2) || || 15,173 || Minute Maid Park || 17–21 || W2
|-  style="text-align:center; bgcolor="#ffbbbb"
| 39 || May 18 || Rangers || 1–4 || Ross (5–0) || Rodríguez (3–4) || Nathan (9) || 34,715 || Minute Maid Park || 17–22 || L1
|-  style="text-align:center; bgcolor="#bbffbb"
| 40 || May 19 || Rangers || 6–5 || Harrell (3–3) || Holland (3–3) || Myers (10) || 42,673 || Minute Maid Park || 18–22 || W1
|-  style="text-align:center; bgcolor="#ffbbbb"
| 41 || May 20 || Rangers || 1–6 || Lewis (4–3) || Lyles (0–1) || || 35,873 || Minute Maid Park || 18–23 || L1
|-  style="text-align:center; bgcolor="#bbffbb"
| 42 || May 21 || Cubs || 8–4 || Norris (5–1) || Garza (2–2) || || 16,895 || Minute Maid Park || 19–23 || W1
|-  style="text-align:center; bgcolor="#bbffbb"
| 43 || May 22 || Cubs || 2–1 || Happ (4–3) || Wood (0–1) || Myers (11) || 20,091 || Minute Maid Park || 20–23 || W2
|-  style="text-align:center; bgcolor="#bbffbb"
| 44 || May 23 || Cubs || 5–1 || Rodríguez (4–4) || Samardzija (4–3) || || 18,732 || Minute Maid Park || 21–23 || W3
|-  style="text-align:center; bgcolor="#bbffbb"
| 45 || May 25 || @ Dodgers || 3–1 || Harrell (4–3) || Kershaw (4–2) || Myers (12) || 36,283 || Dodger Stadium || 22–23 || W4
|-  style="text-align:center; bgcolor="#ffbbbb"
| 46 || May 26 || @ Dodgers || 3–6 || Jansen (4–0) || Wright (0–1) || || 36,561 || Dodger Stadium || 22–24 || L1
|-  style="text-align:center; bgcolor="#ffbbbb"
| 47 || May 27 || @ Dodgers || 1–5 || Capuano (7–1) || Happ (4–4) || || 33,306 || Dodger Stadium || 22–25 || L2
|-  style="text-align:center; bgcolor="#ffbbbb"
| 48 || May 28 || @ Rockies || 7–9 || Belisle (2–2) || F. Rodriguez (1–5) || Betancourt (9) || 34,546 || Coors Field || 22–26 || L3
|-  style="text-align:center; bgcolor="#ffbbbb"
| 49 || May 28 || @ Rockies || 6–7 (10) || Roenicke (1–0) || Myers (0–2) || || 35,786 || Coors Field || 22–27 || L4
|-  style="text-align:center; bgcolor="#ffbbbb"
| 50 || May 30 || @ Rockies || 5–13 || Friedrich (3–1) || Harrell (4–4) || || 28,102 || Coors Field || 22–28 || L5
|-  style="text-align:center; bgcolor="#ffbbbb"
| 51 || May 31 || @ Rockies || 5–11 || Guthrie (3–3) || Norris (5–2) || || 31,799 || Coors Field || 22–29 || L6
|-

|-  style="text-align:center; bgcolor="#ffbbbb"
| 52 || June 1 || Reds || 1–4 || Leake (2–5) || Happ (4–5) || Chapman (4) || 21,464 || Minute Maid Park || 22–30 || L7
|-  style="text-align:center; bgcolor="#ffbbbb"
| 53 || June 2 || Reds || 9–12 || LeCure (1–1) || F. Rodriguez (1–6) || Chapman (5) || 22,991 || Minute Maid Park || 22–31 || L8
|-  style="text-align:center; bgcolor="#bbffbb"
| 54 || June 3 || Reds || 5–3 || Lyles (1–1) || Arroyo (2–4) || Myers (13) || 19,914 || Minute Maid Park || 23–31 || W1
|-  style="text-align:center; bgcolor="#bbffbb"
| 55 || June 5 || Cardinals || 9–8 || Harrell (5–4) || García (3–4) || Myers (14) || 18,911 || Minute Maid Park || 24–31 || W2
|-  style="text-align:center; bgcolor="#ffbbbb"
| 56 || June 6 || Cardinals || 3–4 || Wainwright (5–6) || Norris (5–3) || Motte (10) || 18,517 || Minute Maid Park || 24–32 || L1
|-  style="text-align:center; bgcolor="#ffbbbb"
| 57 || June 7 || Cardinals || 2–14 || Lynn (9–2) || Happ (4–6) || || 22,265 || Minute Maid Park || 24–33 || L2
|-  style="text-align:center; bgcolor="#bbffbb"
| 58 || June 8 || @ White Sox || 8–3 || Rodríguez (5–4) || Floyd (4–6) || || 22,452 || U.S. Cellular Field || 25–33 || W1
|-  style="text-align:center; bgcolor="#ffbbbb"
| 59 || June 9 || @ White Sox || 1–10 || Sale (8–2) || Lyles (1–2) || || 22,880 || U.S. Cellular Field || 25–34 || L1
|-  style="text-align:center; bgcolor="#bbffbb"
| 60 || June 10 || @ White Sox || 11–9 || Harrell (6–4) || Humber (2–4) || Myers (15) || 20,398 || U.S. Cellular Field || 26–34 || W1
|-  style="text-align:center; bgcolor="#ffbbbb"
| 61 || June 12 || @ Giants || 3–6 || Bumgarner (8–4) || Norris (5–4) || Casilla (17) || 42,100 || AT&T Park || 26–35 || L1
|-  style="text-align:center; bgcolor="#ffbbbb"
| 62 || June 13 || @ Giants || 0–10 || Cain (8–2) || Happ (4–7) || || 42,298 || AT&T Park || 26–36 || L2
|-  style="text-align:center; bgcolor="#bbffbb"
| 63 || June 14 || @ Giants || 6–3 || Rodríguez (6–4) || Zito (5–4) || Myers (16) || 41,662 || AT&T Park || 27–36 || W1
|-  style="text-align:center; bgcolor="#ffbbbb"
| 64 || June 15 || @ Rangers || 2–6 || Darvish (8–4) || Lyles (1–3) || || 47,430 || Rangers Ballpark in Arlington || 27–37 || L1
|-  style="text-align:center; bgcolor="#ffbbbb"
| 65 || June 16 || @ Rangers || 3–8 || Grimm (1–0) || Harrell (6–5) || || 48,288 || Rangers Ballpark in Arlington || 27–38 || L2
|-  style="text-align:center; bgcolor="#ffbbbb"
| 66 || June 17 || @ Rangers || 3–9 || Lewis (6–5) || F. Rodriguez (1–7) || || 46,320 || Rangers Ballpark in Arlington || 27–39 || L3
|-  style="text-align:center; bgcolor="#bbffbb"
| 67 || June 18 || Royals || 9–7 || Happ (5–7) || Sánchez (1–3) || Cedeño (1) || 15,436 || Minute Maid Park || 28–39 || W1
|-  style="text-align:center; bgcolor="#ffbbbb"
| 68 || June 19 || Royals || 0–2 || Hochevar (4–7) || Rodríguez (6–5) || Broxton (17) || 18,098 || Minute Maid Park || 28–40 || L1
|-  style="text-align:center; bgcolor="#ffbbbb"
| 69 || June 20 || Royals || 1–2 || Chen (6–6) || Lyles (1–4) || Broxton (18) || 30,687 || Minute Maid Park || 28–41 || L2
|-  style="text-align:center; bgcolor="#ffbbbb"
| 70 || June 22 || Indians || 0–2 || Jiménez (7–5) || Harrell (6–6) || Perez (23) || 26,932 || Minute Maid Park || 28–42 || L3
|-  style="text-align:center; bgcolor="#bbffbb"
| 71 || June 23 || Indians || 8–1 || Keuchel (1–0) || Gómez (4–7) || || 34,241 || Minute Maid Park || 29–42 || W1
|-  style="text-align:center; bgcolor="#bbffbb"
| 72 || June 24 || Indians || 7–1 || Happ (6–7) || Lowe (7–6) || || 21,191 || Minute Maid Park || 30–42 || W2
|-  style="text-align:center; bgcolor="#ffbbbb"
| 73 || June 25 || Padres || 7–8 (10) || Thayer (1–2) || Lyon (0–2) || Street (11) || 14,483 || Minute Maid Park || 30–43 || L1
|-  style="text-align:center; bgcolor="#bbffbb"
| 74 || June 26 || Padres || 5–3 || Lyles (2–4) || Wells (0–1) || Myers (17) || 15,416 || Minute Maid Park || 31–43 || W1
|-  style="text-align:center; bgcolor="#bbffbb"
| 75 || June 27 || Padres || 1–0 || Harrell (7–6) || Richard (5–8) || || 15,012 || Minute Maid Park || 32–43 || W2
|-  style="text-align:center; bgcolor="#ffbbbb"
| 76 || June 28 || Padres || 3–7 || Vincent (1–0) || Myers (0–3) || || 19,415 || Minute Maid Park || 32–44 || L1
|-  style="text-align:center; bgcolor="#ffbbbb"
| 77 || June 29 || @ Cubs || 0–4 || Maholm (5–6) || Norris (5–5) || Mármol (6) || 32,891 || Wrigley Field || 32–45 || L2
|-  style="text-align:center; bgcolor="#ffbbbb"
| 78 || June 30 || @ Cubs || 2–3 || Garza (4–6) || Happ (6–8) || Mármol (7) || 37,906 || Wrigley Field || 32–46 || L3
|-

|-  style="text-align:center; bgcolor="#ffbbbb"
| 79 || July 1 || @ Cubs || 0–3 || Wood (3–3) || Rodríguez (6–6) || Mármol (8) || 37,389 || Wrigley Field || 32–47 || L4
|-  style="text-align:center; bgcolor="#ffbbbb"
| 80 || July 2 || @ Pirates || 2–11 || McDonald (8–3) || Lyles (2–5) || || 21,041 || PNC Park || 32–48 || L5
|-  style="text-align:center; bgcolor="#ffbbbb"
| 81 || July 3 || @ Pirates || 7–8 || Hanrahan (4–0) || Wright (0–2) || || 21,516 || PNC Park || 32–49 || L6
|-  style="text-align:center; bgcolor="#ffbbbb"
| 82 || July 4 || @ Pirates || 4–6 || Correia (5–6) || Keuchel (1–1) || Hanrahan (21) || 36,827 || PNC Park || 32–50 || L7
|-  style="text-align:center; bgcolor="#ffbbbb"
| 83 || July 5 || @ Pirates || 0–2 || Karstens (2–2) || Norris (5–6) || Hanrahan (22) || 21,386 || PNC Park || 32–51 || L8
|-  style="text-align:center; bgcolor="#ffbbbb"
| 84 || July 6 || Brewers || 1–7 || Gallardo (7–6) || Happ (6–9) || || 23,430 || Minute Maid Park || 32–52 || L9 
|-  style="text-align:center; bgcolor="#bbffbb"
| 85 || July 7 || Brewers || 6–3 || Rodríguez (7–6) || Greinke (9–3) || Myers (18) || 23,027 || Minute Maid Park || 33–52 ||  W1
|-  style="text-align:center; bgcolor="#ffbbbb"
| 86 || July 8 || Brewers || 3–5 (10) || Parra (1–3) || F. Rodriguez (1–8) || Axford (15) || 16,966 || Minute Maid Park || 33–53 ||  L1
|-  style="text-align:center; bgcolor="#ffbbbb"
| 87 || July 13 || @ Giants || 1–5 || Bumgarner (11–5) || Rodríguez (7–7) || Casilla (22) || 42,116 || AT&T Park || 33–54 || L2
|-  style="text-align:center; bgcolor="#ffbbbb"
| 88 || July 14 || @ Giants || 2–3 (12) || Affeldt (1–1) || Myers (0–4) || || 42,171 || AT&T Park || 33–55 || L3
|-  style="text-align:center; bgcolor="#ffbbbb"
| 89 || July 15 || @ Giants || 2–3 || Cain (10–3) || Norris (5–7) || Casilla (23) || 42,265 || AT&T Park || 33–56 || L4
|-  style="text-align:center; bgcolor="#bbffbb"
| 90 || July 16 || @ Padres || 2–0 || Happ (7–9) || Wells (1–3) || Myers (19) || 26,098 || Petco Park || 34–56 || W1
|-  style="text-align:center; bgcolor="#ffbbbb"
| 91 || July 17 || @ Padres || 2–8 || Ohlendorf (3–0) || Lyles (2–6) || || 20,944 || Petco Park || 34–57 || L1
|-  style="text-align:center; bgcolor="#ffbbbb"
| 92 || July 18 || @ Padres || 4–8 || Richard (7–10) || Rodríguez (7–8) || Street (15) || 25,713 || Petco Park || 34–58 || L2
|-  style="text-align:center; bgcolor="#ffbbbb"
| 93 || July 19 || @ Padres || 0–1 || Vólquez (6–7) || Harrell (7–7) || || 26,735 || Petco Park || 34–59 || L3
|-  style="text-align:center; bgcolor="#ffbbbb"
| 94 || July 20 || @ Diamondbacks || 8–13 || Cahill (8–8) || Norris (5–8) || || 23,567 || Chase Field || 34–60 || L4
|-  style="text-align:center; bgcolor="#ffbbbb"
| 95 || July 21 || @ Diamondbacks || 3–12 || Miley (11–5) || Keuchel (1–2) || || 35,665 || Chase Field || 34–61 || L5
|-  style="text-align:center; bgcolor="#ffbbbb"
| 96 || July 22 || @ Diamondbacks || 2–8 || Collmenter (2–2) || Lyles (2–7) || || 20,951 || Chase Field || 34–62 || L6
|-  style="text-align:center; bgcolor="#ffbbbb"
| 97 || July 23 || Reds || 3–8 || Latos (8–3) || Rodríguez (7–9) || || 15,538 || Minute Maid Park || 34–63 || L7
|-  style="text-align:center; bgcolor="#ffbbbb"
| 98 || July 24 || Reds || 2–4 || Leake (4–6) || Cordero (3–6) || Chapman (18) || 15,908 || Minute Maid Park || 34–64 || L8
|-  style="text-align:center; bgcolor="#ffbbbb"
| 99 || July 25 || Reds || 3–5 || Marshall (3–3) || Cordero (3–7) || Chapman (19) || 16,077 || Minute Maid Park || 34–65 || L9
|-  style="text-align:center; bgcolor="#ffbbbb"
| 100 || July 26 || Pirates || 3–5 || Burnett (12–3) || Keuchel (1–3) || Hanrahan (30) || 19,926 || Minute Maid Park || 34–66 || L10
|-  style="text-align:center; bgcolor="#ffbbbb"
| 101 || July 27 || Pirates || 5–6 || Watson (5–1) || Cruz (1–1) || Hanrahan (31) || 24,685 || Minute Maid Park || 34–67 || L11
|-  style="text-align:center; bgcolor="#ffbbbb"
| 102 || July 28 || Pirates || 3–4 || Resop (1–3) || Fick (0–1) || Grilli (2) || 34,146 || Minute Maid Park || 34–68 || L12 
|-  style="text-align:center; bgcolor="#bbffbb"
| 103 || July 29 || Pirates || 9–5 || Harrell (8–7) || McDonald (10–5) || || 20,453 || Minute Maid Park || 35–68 || W1
|-  style="text-align:center; bgcolor="#ffbbbb"
| 104 || July 30 || @ Brewers || 7–8 || Hernández (3–1) || Cordero (3–8) || Axford (17) || 28,131 || Miller Park || 35–69 || L1 
|-  style="text-align:center; bgcolor="#ffbbbb"
| 105 || July 31 || @ Brewers || 1–10 || Gallardo (9–8) || Keuchel (1–4) || || 30,011 || Miller Park || 35–70 || L2
|-

|-  style="text-align:center; bgcolor="#ffbbbb"
| 106 || August 1 || @ Brewers || 4–13 || Fiers (5–4) || Lyles (2–8) || || 32,217 || Miller Park || 35–71 || L3
|-  style="text-align:center; bgcolor="#ffbbbb"
| 107 || August 3 || @ Braves || 1–4 || Hudson (11–4) || Galarraga (0–1) || Kimbrel (31) || 28,300 || Turner Field || 35–72 || L4
|-  style="text-align:center; bgcolor="#bbffbb"
| 108 || August 4 || @ Braves || 3–2 || Harrell (9–7) || Maholm (9–7) || López (1) || 30,029 || Turner Field || 36–72 || W1
|-  style="text-align:center; bgcolor="#ffbbbb"
| 109 || August 5 || @ Braves || 1–6 || Venters (4–3) || Norris (5–9) || || 23,474 || Turner Field || 36–73 || L1
|-  style="text-align:center; bgcolor="#ffbbbb"
| 110 || August 6 || Nationals || 4–5 (11) || Stammen (5–1) || López (3–1) || || 13,843 || Minute Maid Park || 36–74 || L2
|-  style="text-align:center; bgcolor="#ffbbbb"
| 111 || August 7 || Nationals || 2–3 (12) || Storen (1–0) || Storey (0–1) || Clippard (23) || 14,273 || Minute Maid Park || 36–75 || L3
|-  style="text-align:center; bgcolor="#ffbbbb"
| 112 || August 8 || Nationals || 3–4 || Gonzalez (14–6) || Galarraga (0–2) || || 16,038 || Minute Maid Park || 36–76 || L4
|-  style="text-align:center; bgcolor="#ffbbbb"
| 113 || August 9 || Nationals || 0–5 || Zimmermann (9–6) || Harrell (9–8) || || 14,417 || Minute Maid Park || 36–77 || L5
|-  style="text-align:center; bgcolor="#bbffbb"
| 114 || August 10 || Brewers || 4–3 || López (4–1) || Axford (4–7) || || 21,025 || Minute Maid Park || 37–77 || W1
|-  style="text-align:center; bgcolor="#bbffbb"
| 115 || August 11 || Brewers || 6–5 (10) || López (5–1) || Henderson (0–1) || || 17,942 || Minute Maid Park || 38–77 || W2
|-  style="text-align:center; bgcolor="#ffbbbb"
| 116 || August 12 || Brewers || 3–5 || Gallardo (11–8) || Lyles (2–9) || Loe (1) || 19,235 || Minute Maid Park || 38–78 || L1
|-  style="text-align:center; bgcolor="#ffbbbb"
| 117 || August 13 || @ Cubs || 1–7 || Samardzija (8–10) || Galarraga (0–3) || || 31,452 || Wrigley Field || 38–79 || L2
|-  style="text-align:center; bgcolor="#bbffbb"
| 118 || August 14 || @ Cubs || 10–1 || Harrell (10–8) || Volstad (0–9) || || 33,376 || Wrigley Field || 39–79 || W1
|-  style="text-align:center; bgcolor="#ffbbbb"
| 119 || August 15 || @ Cubs || 2–7 || Germano (2–2) || Norris (5–10) || || 33,714 || Wrigley Field || 39–80 || L1
|-  style="text-align:center; bgcolor="#ffbbbb"
| 120 || August 17 || Diamondbacks || 1–3 || Miley (13–8) || Keuchel (1–5) || Putz (24) || 19,223 || Minute Maid Park || 39–81 || L2
|-  style="text-align:center; bgcolor="#ffbbbb"
| 121 || August 18 || Diamondbacks || 4–12 || Corbin (5–4) || Lyles (2–10) || || 20,838 || Minute Maid Park || 39–82 || L3
|-  style="text-align:center; bgcolor="#ffbbbb"
| 122 || August 19 || Diamondbacks || 1–8 || Kennedy (11–10) || Galarraga (0–4) || || 14,923 || Minute Maid Park || 39–83 || L4
|-  style="text-align:center; bgcolor="#ffbbbb"
| 123 || August 21 || @ Cardinals || 0–7 || Wainwright (12–10) || Harrell (10–9) || || 35,370 || Busch Stadium || 39–84 || L5
|-  style="text-align:center; bgcolor="#ffbbbb"
| 124 || August 22 || @ Cardinals || 2–4 || Lohse (13–2) || Norris (5–11) || Motte (29) || 35,198 || Busch Stadium || 39–85 ||  L6
|-  style="text-align:center; bgcolor="#ffbbbb"
| 125 || August 23 || @ Cardinals || 5–13 || Westbrook (13–9) || Keuchel (1–6) || || 30,343 || Busch Stadium || 39–86 || L7
|-  style="text-align:center; bgcolor="#bbffbb"
| 126 || August 24 || @ Mets || 3–1 || Lyles (3–10) || Niese (10–7) || López (2) || 25,513 || Citi Field || 40–86 || W1
|-  style="text-align:center; bgcolor="#ffbbbb"
| 127 || August 25 || @ Mets || 1–3 || Dickey (16–4) || Abad (0–1) || Francisco (21) || 29,906 || Citi Field || 40–87 || L1
|-  style="text-align:center; bgcolor="#ffbbbb"
| 128 || August 26 || @ Mets || 1–2 || Parnell (3–3) || López (5–2) || || 25,071 || Citi Field || 40–88 || L2
|-  style="text-align:center; bgcolor="#ffbbbb"
| 129 || August 28 || Giants || 2–3 || Casilla (5–5) || López (5–3) || Romo (7) || 13,516 || Minute Maid Park || 40–89 || L3
|-  style="text-align:center; bgcolor="#ffbbbb"
| 130 || August 29 || Giants || 4–6 || Kontos (1–0) || Keuchel (1–7) || López (5) || 13,207 || Minute Maid Park || 40–90 || L4
|-  style="text-align:center; bgcolor="#ffbbbb"
| 131 || August 30 || Giants || 4–8 || Vogelsong (12–7) || F. Rodriguez (1–9) || Romo (8) || 12,835 || Minute Maid Park || 40–91 || L5
|-  style="text-align:center; bgcolor="#ffbbbb"
| 132 || August 31 || Reds || 3–9 || Leake (7–8) || Abad (0–2) || || 15,287 || Minute Maid Park || 40–92 || L6
|-

|-  style="text-align:center; bgcolor="#bbffbb"
| 133 || September 1 || Reds || 2–1 || López (6–3) || Marshall (4–5) || || 18,316 || Minute Maid Park || 41–92 || W1
|-  style="text-align:center; bgcolor="#ffbbbb"
| 134 || September 2 || Reds || 3–5 || Arredondo (6–2) || Cedeño (0–1) || Chapman (34) || 17,291 || Minute Maid Park || 41–93 || L1
|-  style="text-align:center; bgcolor="#bbffbb"
| 135 || September 3 || @ Pirates || 5–1 || González (1–0) || Locke (0–1) || || 20,055 || PNC Park || 42–93 || W1
|-  style="text-align:center; bgcolor="#ffbbbb"
| 136 || September 4 || @ Pirates || 2–6 || Rodríguez (10–13) || Lyles (3–11) || || 12,785 || PNC Park || 42–94 || L1
|-  style="text-align:center; bgcolor="#ffbbbb"
| 137 || September 5 || @ Pirates || 3–6 || Correia (10–8) || Abad (0–3) || || 14,159 || PNC Park || 42–95 || L2
|-  style="text-align:center; bgcolor="#bbffbb"
| 138 || September 7 || @ Reds || 5–3 || Ambriz (1–0) || Chapman (5–5) || López (3) || 23,785 || Great American Ball Park || 43–95 || W1
|-  style="text-align:center; bgcolor="#ffbbbb"
| 139 || September 8 || @ Reds || 1–5 || Arroyo (12–7) || Norris (5–12) || || 35,018 || Great American Ball Park || 43–96 || L1
|-  style="text-align:center; bgcolor="#bbffbb"
| 140 || September 9 || @ Reds || 5–1 || González (2–0) || Cueto (17–8) || || 33,438 || Great American Ball Park || 44–96 || W1
|-  style="text-align:center; bgcolor="#ffbbbb"
| 141 || September 10 || Cubs || 1–4 || Volstad (3–10) || F. Rodriguez (1–10) || Mármol (19) || 13,121 || Minute Maid Park || 44–97 || L1
|-  style="text-align:center; bgcolor="#bbffbb"
| 142 || September 11 || Cubs || 1–0 || Lyles (4–11) || Germano (2–7) || López (4) || 14,205 || Minute Maid Park || 45–97 || W1
|-  style="text-align:center; bgcolor="#ffbbbb"
| 143 || September 12 || Cubs || 1–5 || Wood (6–11) || Abad (0–4) || || 13,101 || Minute Maid Park || 45–98 || L1
|-  style="text-align:center; bgcolor="#bbffbb"
| 144 || September 13 || Phillies || 6–4 || Wright (1–2) || Aumont (0–1) || López (5) || 13,028 || Minute Maid Park || 46–98 || W1
|-  style="text-align:center; bgcolor="#ffbbbb"
| 145 || September 14 || Phillies ||6–12 || Hamels (15–6) || González (2–1) || || 17,535 || Minute Maid Park || 46–99 || L1
|-  style="text-align:center; bgcolor="#bbffbb"
| 146 || September 15 || Phillies || 5–0 || Keuchel (2–7) || Kendrick (9–11) || || 20,419 || Minute Maid Park || 47–99 || W1
|-  style="text-align:center; bgcolor="#bbffbb"
| 147 || September 16 || Phillies || 7–6 || Wright (2–2) || Bastardo (2–5) || López (6) || 17,438 || Minute Maid Park || 48–99 || W2
|-  style="text-align:center; bgcolor="#ffbbbb"
| 148 || September 18 || @ Cardinals || 1–4 || Lohse (15–3) || Abad (0–5) || Motte (36) || 35,422 || Busch Stadium || 48–100 || L1 
|-  style="text-align:center; bgcolor="#ffbbbb"
| 149 || September 19 || @ Cardinals || 0–5 || Lynn (16–7) || Harrell (10–10) || Motte (37) || 39,062 || Busch Stadium || 48–101 || L2
|-  style="text-align:center; bgcolor="#ffbbbb"
| 150 || September 20 || @ Cardinals || 4–5 || García (5–7) || Norris (5–13) || Motte (38) || 34,788 || Busch Stadium || 48–102 || L3
|-  style="text-align:center; bgcolor="#bbffbb"
| 151 || September 21 || Pirates || 7–1 || F. Rodriguez (2–10) || Locke (0–2) || || 17,093 || Minute Maid Park || 49–102 || W1
|-  style="text-align:center; bgcolor="#bbffbb"
| 152 || September 22 || Pirates || 4–1 || Keuchel (3–7) || Correia (11–10) || López (7) || 17,185 || Minute Maid Park || 50–102 || W2
|-  style="text-align:center; bgcolor="#ffbbbb"
| 153 || September 23 || Pirates || 1–8 || Burnett (16–8) || Lyles (4–12) || || 15,207 || Minute Maid Park || 50–103 || L1
|-  style="text-align:center; bgcolor="#ffbbbb"
| 154 || September 24 || Cardinals || 1–6 || Lynn (17–7) || Abad (0–6) || || 12,584 || Minute Maid Park || 50–104 || L2
|-  style="text-align:center; bgcolor="#ffbbbb"
| 155 || September 25 || Cardinals || 0–4 || García (6–7) || Harrell (10–11) || || 16,943 || Minute Maid Park || 50–105 || L3
|-  style="text-align:center; bgcolor="#bbffbb"
| 156 || September 26 || Cardinals || 2–0 || Norris (6–13) || Carpenter (0–1) || López (8) || 18,712 || Minute Maid Park || 51–105 || W1
|-  style="text-align:center; bgcolor="#bbffbb"
| 157 || September 28 || @ Brewers || 7–6 || González (3–1) || Gallardo (16–9) || López (9) || 41,716 || Miller Park || 52–105 || W2
|-  style="text-align:center; bgcolor="#ffbbbb"
| 158 || September 29 || @ Brewers || 5–9 || Estrada (5–7) || Keuchel (3–8) || || 34,294 || Miller Park || 52–106 || L1
|-  style="text-align:center; bgcolor="#bbffbb"
| 159 || September 30 || @ Brewers || 7–0 || Lyles (5–12) || Fiers (9–10) || || 38,443 || Miller Park || 53–106 || W1
|-

|-  style="text-align:center; bgcolor="#bbffbb"
| 160 || October 1 || @ Cubs || 3-0 || Harrell (11–11) || Berken (0–3) || Wright (1)  || 32,167|| Wrigley Field||54-106 ||W2
|-  style="text-align:center; bgcolor="#bbffbb"
| 161 || October 2 || @ Cubs ||3-0 || Norris (7–13) || Volstad (3–12)  || López (10)||33,168|| Wrigley Field||55-106 ||W3
|-  style="text-align:center; bgcolor="#ffbbbb"
| 162 || October 3 || @ Cubs || 4–5 || Mármol (3–3) || Ambriz (1–1) || || 27,606 || Wrigley Field || 55–107 || L1
|-

Player stats

Batting
Note: G = Games played; AB = At bats; R = Runs scored; H = Hits; 2B = Doubles; 3B = Triples; HR = Home runs; RBI = Runs batted in; BB = Base on balls; SO = Strikeouts; AVG = Batting average; SB = Stolen bases

Pitching
Note: W = Wins; L = Losses; ERA = Earned run average; G = Games pitched; GS = Games started; SV = Saves; IP = Innings pitched; H = Hits allowed; R = Runs allowed; ER = Earned runs allowed; HR = Home runs allowed; BB = Walks allowed;  SO = Strikeouts

Farm system

LEAGUE CHAMPIONS: Lancaster

References

External links
2012 Houston Astros season official site
2012 Houston Astros season at Baseball Reference

Houston Astros seasons
Houston Astros
2012 in sports in Texas